David Sharpe (born October 21, 1995) is an American football offensive tackle for the Baltimore Ravens of the National Football League (NFL). He played college football at Florida and was drafted by the Oakland Raiders in the fourth round of the 2017 NFL Draft. He has also played for the Houston Texans and Washington Football Team.

Professional career

Oakland Raiders
Sharpe was drafted by the Oakland Raiders in the fourth round, 129th overall, in the 2017 NFL Draft. On September 1, 2018, Sharpe was waived by the Raiders.

Houston Texans
On September 12, 2018, Sharpe was signed by the Houston Texans to their practice squad. On September 25, Sharpe was promoted to the active roster. He was waived on October 31, 2018.

Oakland Raiders (second stint)
On November 1, 2018, Sharpe was claimed off waivers by the Raiders. On April 16, 2020, Sharpe was re-signed to a one-year contract.

Washington Football Team
On September 1, 2020, the Raiders traded Sharpe and a seventh round pick in the 2021 NFL Draft to the Washington Football Team in exchange for a sixth round pick in the same draft. In the first 9 games of the season, Sharpe mainly played a backup role at right tackle. Sharpe started at right tackle Week 11 win against the Cincinnati Bengals after normal starter Morgan Moses was moved to left tackle to start in place of Geron Christian and Cornelius Lucas who were unable to play due to injuries. He re-signed with the team on March 29, 2021.

Sharpe was placed on the team's COVID-19 reserve list on July 31, 2021, and was activated on August 23, 2021. He was waived on August 31, 2021.

Baltimore Ravens
On September 21, 2021, the Baltimore Ravens signed Sharpe to their practice squad. On October 23, 2021, Sharpe was elevated to the Ravens' active roster in advance of the team's Week 7 loss to the Cincinnati Bengals, a game in which he played 12 snaps. He reverted to the practice squad after the game. On December 31, 2021, Sharpe was promoted to the active roster.

On August 30, 2022, Sharpe was released by the Ravens and signed to the practice squad the next day.

Sharpe was signed a reserve/future contract on January 1, 2023.

NFL career statistics

References

External links
Florida Gators bio

1995 births
Living people
American football offensive tackles
Florida Gators football players
Houston Texans players
Oakland Raiders players
Washington Football Team players
Players of American football from Jacksonville, Florida
Duncan U. Fletcher High School alumni
Baltimore Ravens players